Derrioides is a genus of moths in the family Geometridae. The genus Derrioides was originally a part of the family Notodontidae, but was moved into the family Geometridae where it is today.

References

Ennominae